The Mink River is a  lacustuary, or freshwater estuary, near the northern tip of the Door Peninsula of Wisconsin, in the United States. It is noted for its excellent bass fishing, and the area boasts more than 200 species of birds.

In 1989, 35 species of birds were found in two habitats in the Mink River Estuary.

See also 
List of lakes of Wisconsin § Door County (Rodgers Lake)

References

External links
Mink River Estuary at the Wisconsin Department of Natural Resources

Bodies of water of Door County, Wisconsin
Rivers of Wisconsin
Estuaries of Wisconsin
Protected areas of Door County, Wisconsin
State Natural Areas of Wisconsin